Veldin Muharemović (born December 6, 1984 in Sarajevo) is a Bosnian football player.

His fans gave him the nickname "Lede". He is currently a defender playing for CS Fola Esch in the Luxembourg National Division.

Playing career

Club
He is a solid and versatile defender. He occasionally switches to a midfield role and scores more goals than is expected for a defender. He is credited by his teammates for his fighting spirit in the defensive line, usually disposing strikers from the ball and leading a counter-attack.

In January, 2008, he was sold to K.S.C. Lokeren in Belgium.

In 2010, he resigned for FK Sarajevo. However, in the summer transfer window of 2011, during July, he signed for FK Xäzär Länkäran in Azerbaijan, only to cancel the transfer one month later and return home to Sarajevo, but this time to FK Olimpic Sarajevo instead of FK Sarajevo.

International
He made his debut for Bosnia and Herzegovina in a June 2007 European Championship qualification match against Malta and has earned a total of 3 caps, scoring no goals and all in UEFA Euro 2008 qualifying, in a total of 14 minutes. His final international was in November 2007 against Turkey.

Career statistics

Club

International

Honours

FK Sarajevo
Premier League of Bosnia and Herzegovina:
Winners (1): 2006–07
Bosnia and Herzegovina Football Cup:
Winners (1): 2004–05

FK Olimpic
Bosnia and Herzegovina Football Cup:
Winners (1): 2014–15

References

External links

Guardian Football
Profile & stats - Lokeren

1984 births
Living people
Footballers from Sarajevo
Association football defenders
Bosnia and Herzegovina footballers
Bosnia and Herzegovina under-21 international footballers
Bosnia and Herzegovina international footballers
FK Sarajevo players
K.S.C. Lokeren Oost-Vlaanderen players
FK Olimpik players
CS Fola Esch players
Premier League of Bosnia and Herzegovina players
Belgian Pro League players
Luxembourg National Division players
Bosnia and Herzegovina expatriate footballers
Expatriate footballers in Belgium
Bosnia and Herzegovina expatriate sportspeople in Belgium
Expatriate footballers in Luxembourg
Bosnia and Herzegovina expatriate sportspeople in Luxembourg